Schaalia georgiae is a species in the genus Schaalia. It is a part of the human periodontal flora.

References

Further reading
 Whitman, William B., et al., eds. Bergey's manual® of systematic bacteriology. Vol. 5. Springer, 2012.

External links
 
 LPSN
 Type strain of Actinomyces georgiae at BacDive -  the Bacterial Diversity Metadatabase

Actinomycetales
Gram-positive bacteria
Bacteria described in 1990